New Market is a census designated place in northern Platte County, in the U.S. state of Missouri. It lies within the Kansas City metropolitan area. The population was 88 at the 2020 census.

The community is located on Missouri Route 371 about 1.5 miles south of the Platte-Buchanan county line. Dearborn is two miles to the northeast across U.S. Route 71 and Bee Creek flows past the west side of the community.

Demographics

History
New Market was originally named Jacksonville, and under the latter name was platted in 1830. A post office called New Market was established in 1839, and remained in operation until 1959.

References

Unincorporated communities in Platte County, Missouri
Unincorporated communities in Missouri